Chokeules, otherwise known as Choke, is a Canadian underground hip hop artist and member of the Backburner crew. His real name is Justin Lepine.
He is a former member of the group Toolshed (with Timbuktu, and Psyborg),

and a member of the group Swamp Thing (with Timbuktu and Savillion).
He also makes up one half of the duo Sequestrians (with Timbuktu). He is a vegan.

The Barrie Advance newspaper responds to Chokeules' first album Hypergraphia with the following quote: "Chokeules spits smooth lyrics over some of the most wicked beats and cuts you've heard in years on a mainstream record".

Chokeules was also one of the guest collaborators on a Train of Thought Tour mixtape (2011).

Discography
Chokeules
 Hypergraphia (2009)
 Stay Up (2014)

Toolshed (Chokeules with Timbuktu & Psyborg)
 Toolshed (2000)
 Clockwork Awkward (2000)
 Schemata (2002)
 Illustrated (2003)
 Relapse (2009)
 The Lost (2011)

Swamp Thing (Chokeules with Timbuktu & Savillion)
 The Grind House EP (2011)
 Creature Feature (2012)
 Fire Dogs (2013)
 Outer Limits (2014)

Backburner (Chokeules with Timbuktu, Ghettosocks, Jesse Dangerously, More or Les, Wordburglar, et al.)
 Heatwave (2011)
 Heatwave Remixes [EP] (2012)
 Eclipse (2015)

Sequestrians (Chokeules with Timbuktu)
 Get the Benjamins (2005)

See also

 Canadian hip hop

References

External links 
 

Living people
Canadian male rappers
Underground rappers
Musicians from London, Ontario
Male hip hop musicians
Rappers from Toronto
21st-century Canadian rappers
21st-century Canadian male musicians
Year of birth missing (living people)